Bandar Penawar is a town in Desaru, Pengerang PBT, Kota Tinggi District, Johor, Malaysia.

History
Bandar Penawar was opened on 1979 by Lembaga Kemajuan Johor Tenggara (Southeast Johor Development Authority) (KEJORA)

Geography
The town spans over an area of 11.5 km2.

Facilities
Lembaga Kemajuan Johor Tenggara (Southeast Johor Development Authority) (KEJORA) main headquarters
Masjid Jamek Bandar Penawar
Perpustakaan Awam Bandar Penawar
Balai Polis Bandar Penawar
Balai Bomba Bandar Penawar
Stadium Kejora Bandar Penawar
Chinese Temples Village (神庙村) - Eight Temples located together at one location
Ma-Zhu Temple or Fong San Kong (凤山宫)

Educations
SM Sains Kota Tinggi
SMK Agama Bandar Penawar
SMK Bandar Penawar
SK Bandar Penawar
SK Bandar Penawar 2
Sekolah Agama Bandar Penawar
Sekolah Sukan Tunku Mahkota Ismail
Kolej Professional Mara
Kolej Komuniti
INSTEDT
Institut Kemahiran Belia Negara (IKBN)

Transportation

The town is served by TransJohor public buses linking to Kota Tinggi Town.

References

Kota Tinggi District
Towns in Johor